Nicholas William Calathes (Greek: Νικόλαος Γουίλιαμ "Νικ" Καλάθης, born February 7, 1989) is a Greek-American professional basketball player for Fenerbahçe Beko of the Turkish Basketball Super League (BSL) and the EuroLeague. He played college basketball for the Florida Gators. An All-EuroLeague First Team selection in 2018 and 2019, Calathes has also played in the NBA, the Greek Basket League and the VTB United League. He represents the Hellenic national basketball team internationally.

Early years
His father started the Orlando Raptors, where he won several AAU Championships. He attended Lake Howell High School in Winter Park, Florida, and graduated as the leading high school basketball scorer in Seminole County history. He teamed with future Florida Gator Chandler Parsons, future VCU Ram Joey Rodriguez, to help Lake Howell to a 31–3 record, and a state championship in 2007. At Lake Howell, Calathes twice won the Florida Mr. Basketball award, placing him on a long list of NBA players who have won that award, including Vince Carter, Amar'e Stoudemire, Brandon Knight, and Austin Rivers.

College career

Calathes accepted an athletic scholarship to attend the University of Florida, where he played for coach Billy Donovan's Florida Gators men's basketball team from 2007 to 2009. Calathes was considered one of the top play-making guards in college basketball. At , he could play the positions of point guard, shooting guard, and small forward.

He was a first-team All-Southeastern Conference (SEC) selection in 2009, and he was the only player in the nation to average better than 15.0 points, 5.0 rebounds, and 6.0 assists per game. Calathes broke the Florida school records for assists and assists per game in each of his first two years, totaling 221 as a freshman (6.1 assists per game), and 231 (6.4 assists per game) as a sophomore. He ranked third in Florida school history in career assists after just two years. He was the SEC Newcomer of the Year and the SEC co-Freshman of the Year in 2008, as he led Florida in scoring and assists.

College career highs and statistics

College season averages

|-
| style="text-align:left;"|2007–08
| style="text-align:left;"|Florida Gators
| 36 || 36 || 32.6 || .426 || .367 || .724 || 5.2 || 6.1 || 1.6 || .1 || 15.3
|-
| style="text-align:left;"|2008–09
| style="text-align:left;"|Florida Gators
| 36 || 35 || 33.3 || .482 || .390 || .707 || 5.3 || 6.4 || 1.9 || .2 || 17.2
|- class="sortbottom"
| style="text-align:center;" colspan="2"|Career
| 72 || 71 || 33.0 || .455 || .380 || .715 || 5.3 || 6.3 || 1.8 || .1 || 16.3

Source:

Professional career

Panathinaikos (2009–2012)
On May 23, 2009, Calathes announced that he would bypass the NBA to play in the Greek Basket League. He agreed to terms with the elite EuroLeague club Panathinaikos Athens. The three-year deal paid Calathes around €2.4 million net income, in addition to providing him with a home, car, and endorsements, making for a total package commensurate with what the NBA rookie salary scale provided an early lottery selection. Despite his commitment to play in Greece, he was still selected in the second round of the 2009 NBA draft by the Minnesota Timberwolves. He was then traded to the Dallas Mavericks for a 2010 second-round draft pick and cash.

In his first year with Panathinaikos, he won the Greek League championship, averaging 5.4 points, 2.0 assists, and 2.2 rebounds in 15 minutes per game. He also participated in the Greek Youth All-Star Game (for players age 22 and under), in which he scored six points and dished six assists. In 2010, Calathes was also voted the third best young player (age 22 and under) in the Greek League, after Nikos Pappas and Vangelis Mantzaris. In the 2010–11 season, Calathes had an average of 7.8 points, 3.2 assists, and 3.1 rebounds in the Greek League. He also participated in the senior men's HEBA Greek All-Star Game, replacing Theo Papaloukas (who was out with an injury), because he was 16th in the fan voting with 1,200 votes. Calathes scored 11 points and dished six assists in the All-Star Game.

In the EuroLeague 2010–11 playoffs, Calathes scored a career-high 12 points against Barcelona in game 4 of the playoff series. Barcelona head coach Xavi Pascual said, "Diamantidis was the MVP of the series, but Calathes was the key player." His teammate, Ian Vougioukas, stated about him, "Calathes played four outstanding games, especially on defense, and was a key for us." In the four-game playoff series against Barcelona, Calathes averaged 7.8 points, 2.5 rebounds, 2.3 assists, and a steal in 26 minutes per game.

In the 2010–11 EuroLeague semifinal against Montepaschi Siena, Calathes had another good performance, which helped send Panathinaikos to the 2011 EuroLeague Final. He scored 17 points, dished two assists to his teammates, and grabbed six rebounds. At the 2011 EuroLeague Final against Maccabi Tel Aviv, Calathes helped Panathinaikos, by scoring four points, recording six assists, and making two steals. Finally, Calathes won his first EuroLeague title. In the 2010–11 Greek League playoffs, Calathes had an average of 8.8 points, 3.0 rebounds, and 3.8 assists per game, in 23 minutes per game. He helped Panathinaikos to reach the Greek League Finals. He played especially good in the fourth game of the Greek League Finals, in which he had 16 points, 11 assists, and five rebounds, in 42 minutes. He won his second Greek League championship with Panathinaikos, and he was named to the Eurobasket.com website's All-Greek A1 League First Team and All-Defensive Team. He also won the Eurobasket.com website's Most Improved Player of the Year award.

Lokomotiv Kuban (2012–2013)
In the summer of 2012, Calathes signed a two-year contract with the Russian VTB United League team Lokomotiv Kuban Krasnodar. He signed a two-year €2.2 million net income contract. He was named to the First Team and selected the season MVP of Europe's 2nd-tier level competition, the EuroCup, in 2013.

Memphis Grizzlies (2013–2015)
On July 22, 2013, the Dallas Mavericks traded Calathes's draft rights to the Memphis Grizzlies in exchange for a 2016 second-round pick. On August 20, 2013, Calathes officially signed a two-year contract with the Grizzlies. In February 2014, starting for the injured Mike Conley, he was named Rookie of the Month, averaging 10.7 points, 4.6 assists and 3.6 rebounds per game.

On April 18, 2014, just days before the 2014 postseason commenced, Calathes was suspended for 20 games for violating the NBA's anti-drug policy; the league stated that Calathes had tested positive for Tamoxifen, though there was no evidence indicating that Calathes had been testosterone doping or using any other performance-enhancing substance that would have been masked by the Tamoxifen. The NBA statement announcing the suspension, which took effect immediately, also indicated that the banned substance was an ingredient in a supplement that Calathes had been taking. Calling the suspension a "true injustice", acting NBPA Executive Director Ron Klempner indicated that the suspension would be appealed.

Return to Panathinaikos (2015–2020)
On July 15, 2015, Panathinaikos announced the signing of Calathes for three years. It was reported that the net income of the deal was $7 million dollars. On October 22, against the Turkish Super League club Karşıyaka Basket, Calathes set a new personal career-high of 11 assists in a EuroLeague game. On March 6, 2016, he won the Greek Cup for the second time in his career, having nine points, seven assists, and four rebounds in the Greek Cup Final. He was named the 2016 Greek League Best Defender. He won the Greek Cup again with Panathinaikos in 2017, as well as the Greek championship title.

In the summer of 2017, Calathes played in The Basketball Tournament on ESPN for Pedro's Posse. He competed for the $2 million prize, losing in the first round to Team 23, by a score of 107–92.

In the 2017–18 season, Calathes emerged as the team leader of Panathinaikos. Over 31 EuroLeague games, he averaged career-highs of 14.5 points and 8 assists per game. In May 2018, he was named to the All-EuroLeague First Team of the 2017–18 season.

On June 27, 2018, Calathes agreed to a €6.5 million net income contract extension with Panathinaikos, that would keep him in Athens through the 2020–21 season.

Barcelona (2020–2022)
On July 9, 2020, Calathes signed with FC Barcelona of the Spanish Liga ACB.  On June 23, 2022, Calathes was excluded from the plans of Barcelona coach, Šarūnas Jasikevičius, for the 2022-2023 season, after arguments between the two ex-teammates and due to the decision of the Blaugrana to cut down on their budget.

Fenerbahçe (2022–present)
On August 23, 2022, he has signed with Fenerbahçe of the Turkish Basketball Super League (BSL).

National team career

Junior national team
Calathes made his debut with the Greek junior national team at the 2008 FIBA Europe Under-20 Championship, where he averaged 11.2 points, 3.5 rebounds, and 3.7 assists in 22 minutes per game. With the Under-20 Greek junior national basketball team, he played in 10 games in total, scoring 115 points, averaging 11.5 points per game.

Senior national team

In 2009, Calathes debuted with the Greece men's national basketball team, and with them he won the bronze medal at the EuroBasket 2009. At the 2009 EuroBasket, Calathes was 5th in the tournament in steals, with 1.6 per game, and he also averaged 4.1 points, 2.1 rebounds, and two assists, in 17 minutes per game. In the semifinal against Spain, despite his team losing the game, he scored 10 points, grabbed four rebounds, dished two assists, and made two steals.

The next summer, at the 2010 FIBA World Championship, Greece failed to win a medal. Calathes averaged 4.5 points, 2.2 rebounds, and 2.5 assists during the tournament. At the EuroBasket 2011, Calathes helped Greece to finish in sixth place, with averages of 9.2 points and 3.8 assists per game. He also played at the 2012 FIBA World Olympic Qualifying Tournament.

Calathes was suspended from competing in any FIBA competitions for four months, from April 2014 to August 2014, by WADA. This was due to his NBA suspension for violating the league's anti-drug policy, after he tested positive for Tamoxifen.

With Greece, he also played at the 2014 FIBA Basketball World Cup, the EuroBasket 2015, and the 2016 Turin FIBA World Olympic Qualifying Tournament. He also played with Greece at the EuroBasket 2017, and the 2019 FIBA World Cup qualification.

Calathes has played with the Greece men's national basketball team in 105 games to date, scoring 851 points, for an average of 8.1 points per game.

Greek senior national team stats

|-
| align="left" | 2009 EB
| align="left" rowspan=9| Greece
| 8 || 1 || 17.3 || .353 || .182 || .636 || 2.1 || 2.0 || 1.6 || 0.1 || 4.1
|-
| style="text-align:left;"| 2010 WC
| 6 || 0 || 12.7 || .49107 || .000 || .625 || 2.2 || 2.5 || .7 || 0.2 || 4.5
|-
| align="left" | 2011 EB
| 11 || 10 || 25.5 || .418 || .222 || .784 || 2.6 || 3.8 || 1.6 || 0.1 || 9.2
|- 
| style="text-align:left;"| 2012 OQT
| 3 || 2 || 18.3 || .429 || .1000 || .778 || 2.0 || 3.0 || .7 || 0.0 || 7.3
|-
| align="left" | 2014 WC
| 6 || 6 || 26.2 || .509 || .375 || .462 || 3.7|| 2.3 || 0.8 || 0.7 || 11.3
|-
| style="text-align:left;" | 2015 EB
| 8 || 8 || 25.1 || .556 || .611 || .667 || 2.3 || 5.3 || 0.8 || 0.1 || 9.9 
|-
| align="left" | 2016 OQT
| 3 || 3 || 19.7 || .412 || .286 || .000 || 2.3 || 5.3 || 1.7 || 0.3 || 5.3
|-
| align="left" | 2017 EB
| 7 || 7 || 27.7 || .500 || .333 || .462 || 3.4 || 5.0 || 1.3 || 0.0 || 13.6
|-
| align="left"| 2019 WC
| 5 || 5 || 28.7 || .491 || .417 || .429 || 4.4 || 5.4 || 1.6 || 0.0 || 13.4

Personal life
Calathes was born to a Greek-American father and an Irish-American mother. He holds dual citizenship with the United States and Greece. He acquired his Greek passport on June 30, 2008, due to his Greek background. His paternal grandparents emigrated to Florida from the Greek island Lemnos. His older brother, Pat, is also a professional basketball player.

Calathes' last name in Greek translates as "basket" (καλάθι). In 2013, Calathes' fiancé, Tiffany, gave birth to the couple's first child.

Career statistics

European Leagues

|-
| align="left" | 2009–10
| align="left" | Panathinaikos
| EuroLeague
| 14 || 13.7 || .386 || .227 || .455 || 1.9 || 1.7 || 0.6 || .0 || 3.5 
|-
| align="left" | 2010–11
| align="left" | Panathinaikos
| EuroLeague
| 22 || 15.4 || .562 || .353 || .692 || 1.6 || 1.5 || 0.7 || .1 || 4.8 
|-
| align="left" | 2011–12
| align="left" | Panathinaikos
| EuroLeague
| 23 || 23.5 || .486 || .298 || .500 || 2.8 || 2.4 || 1.2 || .0 || 7.6 
|-
| align="left" | 2012–13
| align="left" | Lokomotiv Kuban
| VTB United League
| 30 || 30.4 || .508 || .355 || .579 || 4.3 || 6.1 || 1.6 || .1 || 13.9 
|-
| align="left" | 2015–16
| align="left" | Panathinaikos
| Greek Basket League
| 25 || 27.4 || .400 || .280 || .457 || 4.3 || 6.5 || 1.9 || .2 || 7.7 
|-
| align="left" | 2015–16
| align="left" | Panathinaikos
| EuroLeague
| 27 || 30.2 || .417 || .329 || .568 || 4.1 || 6.4 || 2.0 || .2 || 9.0 
|-
| align="left" | 2016–17
| align="left" | Panathinaikos
| EuroLeague
| 33 || 27.2 || .405 || .246 || .500 || 4.0 || 5.5 || 1.5 || .2 || 9.8 
|-
| align="left" | 2017–18
| align="left" | Panathinaikos
| Greek Basket League
| 35 || 21.5 || .460 || .318 || .500 || 3.9 || 6.9 || 1.7 || .1 || 10.4 
|-
| align="left" | 2017–18
| align="left" | Panathinaikos
| EuroLeague
| 31 || 29.0 || .476 || .293 || .576 || 3.8 || 8.0 || 1.7 || .1 || 14.6 
|-
| align="left" | 2018–19
| align="left" | Panathinaikos
| Greek Basket League
| 27 || 22.3 || .438 || .378 || .811 || 3.4 || 8.2 || 1.4 || .0 || 9.8 
|-
| align="left" | 2018–19
| align="left" | Panathinaikos
| EuroLeague
| 33 ||  30.9 || .392 || .265 || .528 || 4.3 || 8.7 || 1.7 || .1 || 12.2 
|-
| align="left" | 2019–20
| align="left" | Panathinaikos
| EuroLeague
| 28 || 32.2 || .420 || .281 || .594 || 4.9 || 9.1 || 1.1 || .1 || 13.3 
|-
| align="left" | 2020–21
| align="left" | FC Barcelona
| Liga ACB
| 34 || 19.4 || .476 || .403 || .571 || 2.9 || 5.2 || 1.1 || .1 || 7.9 
|-
| align="left" | 2020–21
| align="left" | FC Barcelona
| EuroLeague
| 41 || 25.2 || .428 || .327 || .533 || 3.3 || 6.5 || .9 || .2 || 7.8
|-
|-class=sortbottom
| align="center" colspan=2 | Career
| All Leagues
| 403 || 25.4 || .442 || .309 || .559 || 3.6 || 6.2 || 1.4 || .1 || 9.8

NBA

Regular season

|-
| style="text-align:left;"| 
| style="text-align:left;"| Memphis
| 71 || 7 || 16.5 || .457 || .311 || .611 || 1.9 || 2.9 || .9 || .1 || 4.9
|-
| style="text-align:left;"| 
| style="text-align:left;"| Memphis
| 58 || 0 || 14.4 || .424 || .256 || .533 || 1.8 || 2.5 || 1.1 || .1 || 4.2
|- class="sortbottom"
| style="text-align:center;" colspan="2"| Career
| 129 || 7 || 15.6 || .441 || .288 || .581 || 1.9 || 2.7 || 1.0 || .1 || 4.6

Playoffs

|-
| style="text-align:left;"| 2015
| style="text-align:left;"| Memphis
| 9 || 3 || 14.0 || .333 || .462 || .375 || 1.8 || 1.8 || 1.0 || .1 || 3.7
|- class="sortbottom"
| style="text-align:center;" colspan="2"| Career
| 9 || 3 || 14.0 || .333 || .462 || .375 || 1.8 || 1.8 || 1.0 || .1 || 3.7

See also

List of European basketball players in the United States

References

External links

Nick Calathes at basket.gr 
Nick Calathes at draftexpress.com
Nick Calathes at esake.gr 
Nick Calathes at espn.com
Nick Calathes at eurobasket.com
Nick Calathes at euroleague.net
Nick Calathes at fiba.com
Nick Calathes at gatorzone.com

1989 births
Living people
2010 FIBA World Championship players
2014 FIBA Basketball World Cup players
2019 FIBA Basketball World Cup players
American expatriate basketball people in Russia
American expatriate basketball people in Spain
American expatriate basketball people in Turkey
American men's basketball players
American people of Greek descent
American people of Irish descent
Basketball players from Florida
Doping cases in basketball
FC Barcelona Bàsquet players
Fenerbahçe men's basketball players
Florida Gators men's basketball players
Greek Basket League players
Greek expatriate basketball people in Russia
Greek expatriate basketball people in Spain
Greek expatriate basketball people in Turkey
Greek men's basketball players
Greek people of Irish descent
Liga ACB players
McDonald's High School All-Americans
Memphis Grizzlies players
Minnesota Timberwolves draft picks
National Basketball Association players from Greece
Panathinaikos B.C. players
Parade High School All-Americans (boys' basketball)
PBC Lokomotiv-Kuban players
People from Casselberry, Florida
Point guards
Sportspeople from Seminole County, Florida